Armenteule is a former commune in the Hautes-Pyrénées department in southwestern France. On 1 January 2016, it was merged into the commune of Loudenvielle.

Population

See also
Communes of the Hautes-Pyrénées department

References

Former communes of Hautes-Pyrénées